"This Is Love" is Hikaru Utada's first Japanese digital single (23rd overall). It was released on May 31, 2006 as a promotional single for her fourth Japanese studio album. "This Is Love" was tied-in as the CM song for a Nissin cup noodle campaign and the opening theme for an anime "Freedom," which was also tied into the Nippon campaign. The digital single reached number one in virtually every online music store in Japan prior to the ULTRA BLUE album's release, including the most used store in Japan, iTunes Japan, as well as OnGen, among others. Utada herself is quoted to have said that this song is about expressing that "Love is like a mix of extremes: anxiety and peace."

On December 20, 2006 iTunes Japan released a list of top downloaded singles and albums; "This is Love" ranked as #9 making it the 9th most downloaded song for 2006.

Chart rankings

Certifications and sales

References 

2006 singles
2006 songs
Hikaru Utada songs
Songs used as jingles
Songs written by Hikaru Utada